Mirjaveh railway station or Mirjawa railway station is located in Mirjaveh, Iran. It is one of three Pakistan Railways stations in Iran.

See also
 List of railway stations in Iran
 Pakistan Railways

References

External links

Railway stations in Iran
Railway stations in Pakistan
Railway stations on Quetta–Taftan Railway Line